Panasonic Lumix DMC-FX700 is a digital camera by Panasonic Lumix. The highest-resolution pictures it records is 14.1 megapixels, through its 24mm Ultra Wide-Angle Leica DC VARIO-SUMMICRON.

Property
2.2 LEICA DC VARIO-SUMMICRON Lens with 24mm Ultra Wide-Angle and 5x Optical Zoom
Full HD Movie Recording: 1920x 1080
Venus Engine FHD with Even Higher Signal Processing Performance

References

External links
DMC-FX700S on shop.panasonic.com
DMC-FX700K on shop.panasonic.com
Panasonic Lumix DMC-FX700 review

Bridge digital cameras
FX700